Photon antibunching generally refers to a light field with photons more equally spaced than a coherent laser field, a signature being signals at appropriate detectors which are anticorrelated. More specifically, it can refer to sub-Poissonian photon statistics, that is a photon number distribution for which the variance is less than the mean. A coherent state, as output by a laser far above threshold, has Poissonian statistics yielding random photon spacing; while a thermal light field has super-Poissonian statistics and yields bunched photon spacing.  In the thermal (bunched) case, the number of fluctuations is larger than a coherent state; for an antibunched  source they are smaller.

Explanation
The variance of the photon number distribution is

 

Using commutation relations, this can be written as

 

This can be written as

 

The second-order intensity correlation function (for zero delay time) is defined as

 

This quantity is basically the probability of detecting two simultaneous photons, normalized by the probability of detecting two photons at once for a random photon source. Here and after we assume stationary counting statistics.

Then we have

 

We can equivalently express antibunching by  where the Mandel Q parameter is defined as

 

If the field had a classical stochastic process underlying it, say a positive definite probability distribution for photon number, the variance would have to be greater than or equal to the mean. Sub-Poissonian fields violate this, and hence are nonclassical in the sense that there can be no underlying positive definite probability distribution for photon number (or intensity).

Photon antibunching by this definition was first observed by Kimble, Mandel, and Dagenais in resonance fluorescence. A driven atom cannot emit two photons at once, and so in this case . An experiment with more precision that did not require subtraction of a background count rate was done for a single atom in an ion trap by Walther et al.

A more general definition for photon antibunching concerns the slope of the correlation function away from zero time delay. It can also be shown by an application of the Cauchy–Schwarz inequality to the time dependent intensity correlation function

 

It can be shown that for a classical positive definite probability distribution to exist (i.e. for the field to be classical) . Hence a rise in the second order intensity correlation function at early times is also nonclassical. This initial rise is photon antibunching.

Another way of looking at this time dependent correlation function, inspired by quantum trajectory theory is

 

where

 

Experiments

Spatial antibunching has been observed in photon pairs produced by spontaneous parametric down-conversion.

See also 
 Correlation does not imply causation
 Degree of coherence
 Fock state
 Hong–Ou–Mandel effect
 Hanbury Brown and Twiss effect
 Squeezed coherent state

Sources 
 Article based on text from Qwiki, reproduced under the GNU Free Documentation License: see Photon Antibunching

References

External links
Photon antibunching (Becker & Hickl GmbH, web page)

Quantum optics